Raphitoma hoernesi is an extinct species of sea snail, a marine gastropod mollusc in the family Raphitomidae.

Description
The length of the shell attains 14 mm, its diameter 7 mm.

The oblong-clavate shell is thick and solid. The conical spire is acuminate and contains eight narrow whorls. The whorls show nine, pronounced, straight longitudinal ribs positioned at equal and regular intervals, becoming slightly nodulous at the suture. The interstices are somewhat larger and slightly cut across by striae. The body whorl is somewhat smaller than the spire. The siphonal canal is short, narrow and somewhat twisted. The outer lip is incrassate and inside denticulate. The columella is wrinkled.

Distribution
Fossils of this extinct marine species were found in Miocene strata in Aquitaine, France.

References

External links
 Fossilshells.nl: Raphitomidae

hoernesi
Gastropods described in 1869